Koji Takano (高野 光司, born 23 December 1992) is a Japanese football player for Kagoshima United FC.

National team career
In October 2009, Takano was elected Japan U-17 national team for 2009 U-17 World Cup. He played 1 match against Mexico.

Club statistics
Updated to 23 February 2017.

1Includes Emperor's Cup.

References

External links
Profile at Kagoshima United FC

1992 births
Living people
Association football people from Tokyo
Japanese footballers
Japan youth international footballers
J2 League players
J3 League players
Japan Football League players
Tokyo Verdy players
Giravanz Kitakyushu players
FC Machida Zelvia players
Azul Claro Numazu players
Kagoshima United FC players
Association football midfielders